Everton Lock-Up, sometimes referenced by one of its nicknames such as Prince Rupert's Tower or Prince Rupert's Castle is a village lock-up located on Everton Brow in Everton, Liverpool. The 18th-century structure is one of two Georgian lock-ups that still survive in Liverpool; the other is in Wavertree. It is famous for being the centre-piece of the crest of Everton F.C.

The Grade II-listed building, which was opened in 1787, was originally an overnight holding place where local drunks and criminals were taken by parish constables. Prisoners would then be brought before local Justices of the Peace for trial. Punishments would usually be similar to community service such as clearing ditches, unblocking drains or removing rubbish. 

The Friends of Everton Park have included the lock-up in their Everton Park Heritage Trail with information boards displayed near the building. It is sometimes called Prince Rupert's Tower, though it was in fact erected 143 years after Prince Rupert's Royalist Army camped in the area during the English Civil War Siege of Liverpool in 1644.

It is likely the name arose because Everton Brow was historically where preparations were made to attack the Parliamentarian garrison holding Liverpool Castle. Prince Rupert, as commander of the Royalist cavalry of Charles I is said to have looked down on the fortress and dismissed it with the words: "It is a crow’s nest that any party of schoolboys could take!" It eventually fell after a week of heavy fighting and the loss of 1,500 of his men.

Use by Everton F.C.
A depiction of the Everton Lock-Up has appeared on the crest of professional football club Everton F.C. since 1938. In 2003, a plaque was added to the building stating the importance of its sporting association. In May 1997, Everton gave £15,000 for renovating the structure and in February 2014 Everton Lock-Up was permanently illuminated blue.

References

Grade II listed buildings in Liverpool
Everton F.C.